Luca John Connell (born 20 April 2001) is an Irish professional footballer who plays as a defensive midfielder for EFL League One side Barnsley. He started his senior career with Bolton Wanderers before moving to Celtic, from whom he spent two loan spells at Queen's Park.

He has represented the Republic of Ireland at under-17 to under-21 levels.

Early life
Connell was born in Liverpool, Merseyside.

Club career

Bolton Wanderers
Connell joined Bolton Wanderers at the age of nine. He joined the under-18s as a first-year scholar for the 2017–18 season, and was promoted to the under-23s for the 2018–19 campaign.

On 5 January 2019, Connell made his competitive debut in a 5–2 win over Walsall in the FA Cup Third Round as an 89th minute substitute replacing Luke Murphy. Two weeks later, he was named as unused substitute in a 2–0 league defeat to West Bromwich Albion. On 25 January, Connell started his first senior game in a 2–1 defeat to Bristol City in the FA Cup Fourth Round and assisted Mark Beevers' goal. He was rewarded with a league debut four days later in a 1–1 draw against Reading. Connell's scholarship contract was extended for a further year on 21 May 2019.

Celtic
On 29 June 2019, Connell signed a four-year deal with Celtic for a fee of around £350,000.

Connell was loaned to Queen's Park in March 2021 and again in September 2021. He helped them achieve back to back promotions during his two loan spells (from League Two to League One and then from League One to the Championship).

On 3 June 2022, it was announced that Connell had been released by Celtic, despite having a year left on his contract. He left without having made a senior appearance during his three years with the club.

Barnsley
On 17 June 2022, Connell returned to England to join League One club Barnsley on a three-year contract.

International career
Connell is eligible to represent England and the Republic of Ireland.

In August 2017, Connell was invited to train with the Republic of Ireland under-17 squad. On 21 March 2018, Connell made his international debut at under-17 level in a 3–0 win against Macedonia. Three days later, he featured in a 2–0 victory against Georgia. In May 2018, Connell made two appearances in the 2018 UEFA European Under-17 Championship group stages, playing in wins against Denmark and Bosnia and Herzegovina.

He was called up to the under-18s for the first time in November 2018, and made his debut in a 2–1 win against Belgium. In the following days, Connell started in a 3–1 defeat to England and 1–0 win against the Netherlands. In March 2019, he was called up to the under-19s. Connell featured in victories against Romania, Azerbaijan and Russia as Ireland qualified for the UEFA European Under-19 Championship.

In May 2019 he received his first call-up to the Republic of Ireland senior national team. Connell's first trip with the Republic of Ireland squad ended prematurely though as he was forced to pull out of the squad with a thigh strain.

Connell made his Republic of Ireland U21 debut on the 26 March 2021, playing the full 90 minutes in a 2–1 win over Wales U21 in Wrexham.

Career statistics

Honours
Queen's Park
Scottish League Two: 2020–21
Scottish League One promotion play-offs: 2022

References

External links
Profile at BWFC.co.uk

2001 births
Living people
Footballers from Liverpool
English footballers
Republic of Ireland association footballers
Association football defenders
Association football midfielders
Bolton Wanderers F.C. players
Celtic F.C. players
Queen's Park F.C. players
Barnsley F.C. players
English Football League players
Scottish Professional Football League players
Republic of Ireland youth international footballers
Republic of Ireland under-21 international footballers
English people of Irish descent